The Peranakans are an sub-culture of Chinese defined by their genealogical descent from the first waves of Southern Chinese settlers to maritime Southeast Asia, known as Nanyang, namely the British Colonial ruled ports in the Malay Peninsula, the Indonesian Archipelago as well as Singapore. Peranakan culture, especially in the dominant Peranakan centres of Malacca, Singapore, Penang, Phuket and Tangerang, is characterized by its unique hybridization of ancient Chinese culture with the local cultures of the Nusantara region, the result of a centuries-long history of transculturation and interracial marriage.

Immigrants from the southern provinces of China arrived in significant numbers in the region between the 14th and 17th centuries, taking abode in the Malay Peninsula (where their descendants in Malacca, Singapore and Penang are referred to as Baba–Nyonya); the Indonesian Archipelago (where their descendants are referred to as Kiau–Seng); and Southern Thailand, primarily in Phuket, Trang, Phang Nga, Takaupa and Ranong. Intermarriage between these Chinese settlers and their Malay, Thai, Javanese or other predecessors in the region contributed to the emergence of a distinctive hybrid culture and ostensible phenotypic differences.

The Peranakans are considered a multiracial community, with the caveat that individual family histories vary widely and likewise self-identification with multiracialism as opposed to Chineseness varies widely. The Malay/Indonesian phrase "orang Cina bukan Cina" ("a not-Chinese Chinese person") encapsulates the complex relationship between Peranakan identity and Chinese identity. The particularities of genealogy and the unique syncretic culture are the main features that distinguish the Peranakan from descendants of later waves of Chinese immigrants to the region.

Terminology

Etymology
The word Peranakan is a grammatical inflection of the Malay and Indonesian word anak, meaning child or offspring. With the addition of the prefix per- and the suffix -an to the root anak, the modified word peranakan has a variety of meanings. Among other things, it can mean womb, or it can be used as a designator of genealogical descent, connoting ancestry or lineage, including great-grandparents or more-distant ancestors. On its own, when used in common parlance, the word "peranakan" does not denote a specific ethnicity of descent unless followed by a subsequent qualifying noun. For example Peranakan Tionghoa/Cina may simply mean "Chinese descendants"; likewise Jawi Peranakan can mean "Arab descendants", or Peranakan Belanda "Dutch descendants".

However, in a semantic shift, the word peranakan has come to be used as a "metaphorical" adjective that has the meaning of "locally born but non-indigenous". In Indonesian, it can denote "hybrid" or "crossbred". Thus the term "Peranakan Cina" or "Peranakan Tionghoa" can have the literal or archaic meaning of "Chinese womb" or "Chinese descendants" or "Chinese ancestry" or "descended from the Chinese"—but more latterly has come to mean "locally born but non-indigenous Chinese" or even "half-caste Chinese". The semantic shift is presumed to have arisen from the thorough hybridization or assimilation of the earliest Chinese or other non-indigenous settlers in the Malay Archipelago such that their ethnic heritage needed to be specified whenever referring to them, either to avoid confusion or to emphasise difference. The designator peranakan—in its original sense simply connoting "descendant of X ethnicity", or "the wombs of X"—emerged as the name for entire ethnic groups that were "locally born but non-indigenous" or perceived to be "hybrid" and "crossbred", and, in time, the latter meaning has come to predominate. It should also be noted that the broadness of the semantic range of peranakan means that it can have significantly different connotations in different parts of the Nusantara region and across different dialects or variants of the Malay and Indonesian languages.

The word Peranakan, which can have very broad and labile meanings in Malay and Indonesian and, when used in common parlance, is simply an indicator of heritage or descent, may also be used to refer to other ethnic groups in the same region. Owing to the broad meaning of the term 'peranakan', the term is also encountered when referring to other communities in the region with similar histories of immigration and assimilation. For example, the Chitty may accurately refer to themselves as 'Indian Hindu Peranakans', meaning "of Indian Hindu descent" or "locally born but non-indigenous Indian Hindu". Likewise the Kristang may accurately refer to themselves as 'Eurasian Peranakans'. The name of the Jawi Pekan people is derived from 'Peranakan', Jawi being the Javanised Arabic script, and Pekan being a colloquial contraction of Peranakan.

Chinese Peranakan

The prominence of Peranakan Chinese culture, however, has led to the common elision whereby 'Peranakan' may simply be taken to refer to the Peranakan Chinese, i.e. the culturally unique descendants of the earliest Chinese settlers in the Malay Archipelago, as opposed to the other smaller groups that also justifiably call themselves 'peranakan'. For some Peranakans of Chinese descent, calling oneself "Peranakan" without the qualifier "Chinese" can be a way of asserting an ethnic identity distinct from and independent of Chineseness (though such a use of "Peranakan" as a single-word ethnonym may clash with the desire of other groups of non-Chinese descent to equally call themselves "Peranakan").

Later waves of immigrants to South East Asia are generally referred to using larger umbrella terms such as Malaysian Chinese, Chinese Singaporean, Chinese Indonesian or Tionghoa, or Thai Chinese.

Straits Chinese
One of the sub-groups of Chinese-Peranakan, Straits Chinese or Straits-born Chinese were defined as those born or living in the Straits Settlement: a British colony consisting of Penang, Malacca and Singapore which was established in 1826. Straits Chinese were not considered Baba Nyonya unless they displayed certain Sino-Malay syncretic attributes, in terms of attire worn, food, spoken language, choice of education, preferred career choices, choice of religion and loyalties.

However, given that 'Straits Chinese' is a geographical designator specific to the former British colonies in the region, whereas 'Peranakan Chinese' is a broader genealogical designator covering all parts of the Nusantara region where Chinese people settled (including areas colonized by the Dutch, who would not have used the word 'Straits'), the two terms cannot be said to fully overlap or be interchangeable. Someone who is said to be 'Straits Chinese' in British colonial documents might, for example, be non-Peranakan, i.e. a person who arrived in the Nusantara region during much later periods of Chinese migration.

Conversely, the other Dutch, Malay and Siamese-speaking Peranakan Chinese in Dutch East Indies, Siam and Malaya would be unlikely to refer to themselves using the English term 'Straits Chinese'.

Baba-Nyonya
The Peranakan Chinese commonly refer to themselves as Baba-Nyonya. The term Baba is an honorific for Straits Chinese men. It originated as a Hindi (originally Persian) loan-word borrowed by Malay speakers as a term of affection for one's grandparents, and became part of the common vernacular. In Penang Hokkien, it is pronounced bā-bā (in Pe̍h-ōe-jī), and sometimes written with the phonetic loan characters 峇峇. Female Straits-Chinese descendants were either called or styled themselves Nyonyas. Nyonya (also spelled nyonyah or nonya) is a Malay and Indonesian honorific used to refer to a foreign married lady. It is a loan word, borrowed from the old Portuguese word for lady donha (compare, for instance, Macanese creole nhonha spoken on Macau, which was a Portuguese colony for 464 years). Because Malays at that time had a tendency to address all foreign women (and perhaps those who appeared foreign) as nyonya, they used that term for Straits-Chinese women as well. It gradually became more exclusively associated with them. In Penang Hokkien, it is pronounced nō͘-niâ (in Pe̍h-ōe-jī), and sometimes written with the phonetic loan characters 娘惹.

Ancestry

Many Peranakans identify as Holoh (Hokkien) despite being of numerous origins, such as the descendants of adopted local Malaysian aborigines and Chinese-influenced Arab and Persian merchants from Quanzhou who intermarried with local Malaysians. A sizeable number are of Teochew or Hakka descent, including a small minority of Cantonese.

Baba Nyonya are a subgroup within Chinese communities. Peranakan families occasionally arranged brides from China for their sons or arranged marriages for their daughters with newly arrived Chinese immigrants.

There are parallels between the Peranakan Chinese and the Cambodian Hokkien, who are descendants of Hoklo Chinese. Likewise the Pashu of Myanmar, a Burmese word for the Peranakan or Straits Chinese who have settled in Myanmar.

They maintained their culture partially despite their native language gradually disappearing a few generations after settlement. 

Popular accounts of the Peranakan Chinese in Malacca, Singapore, and Penang sometimes state exclusive descent from the royal retinue of a purported Ming Dynasty princess named Hang Li Po or Hong Li-Po—mentioned in the Malay Annals as having made a marriage of alliance with the Sultan of Malacca in the fifteenth century—but the historical evidence for this (likely romanticized) claim is unreliable.

A 2021 genetic study of Peranakans in Singapore found that on average, their ancestry was 5–10% Malay.

Language

The language of the Peranakans, Baba Malay (Bahasa Melayu Baba) or Peranakan Malay, is a creole language related to the Malay language (Bahasa Melayu), which contains many Hokkien words. It is a dying language, and its contemporary use is mainly limited to members of the older generation. It is common for the Peranakan of the older generation (particularly among women) to latah in Peranakan Malay when experiencing unanticipated shock.

The Peranakan Malay spoken by the Malaccan Peranakans community is strongly based on the Malay language as most of them can only speak little to none of the language of their Chinese forebears. Whereas in the east coast of Peninsula Malaysia, the Peranakans are known to not only speak a Hokkien version of their own but also Thai and Kelantanese Malay in Kelantan and Terengganu Malay in Terengganu. Unlike the rest of the Peranakans in Malaysia, Penang Peranakans are much heavily influenced by a dialect of Hokkien known locally as Penang Hokkien.

In Indonesia, the Peranakan language is mainly based on Indonesian and Javanese, which is mixed with elements of different Chinese varieties, mostly Hokkien. Speakers of the Peranakan language can be found scattered along the northern coastline area throughout West Java, Central Java and East Java, and also in Special Region of Yogyakarta, Indonesia. Young Peranakans can still speak this creole language, although its use is limited to informal occasions.

History

The first Chinese immigrants to settle in the Malay Archipelago arrived from Guangdong and Fujian provinces in the 10th century C.E. They were joined by much larger numbers of the Chinese in the 15th through 17th centuries, following on the heels of the Ming emperor's reopening of Chinese-Malay trade relations in the 15th century.

In the 15th century, some small city-states of the Malay Peninsula often paid tribute to various kingdoms such as those of China and Siam. Close relations with China were established in the early 15th century during the reign of Parameswara when Admiral Zheng He (Cheng Ho), a Muslim Chinese, visited Malacca and Java during his expedition (1405–1433). According to a legend in 1459 CE, the Emperor of China sent a princess, Hang Li Po, to the Sultan of Malacca as a token of appreciation for his tribute. The nobles (500 sons of ministers) and servants who accompanied the princess initially settled in Bukit Cina and eventually grew into a class of Straits-born Chinese known as the Peranakans.

Due to economic hardships in mainland China, waves of immigrants from China settled in Malaysia, Indonesia and Singapore. Some of them embraced the local customs, while still retaining some degree of their ancestral culture; they are known as the Peranakans. Peranakans normally have a certain degree of indigenous blood, which can be attributed to the fact that during imperial China, most immigrants were men who married the local women. Peranakans at Tangerang, Indonesia, held such a high degree of indigenous blood that they are almost physically indistinguishable from the local population. Peranakans in Indonesia can vary between very fair to copper tan in colour.

Chinese men in Melaka fathered children with Javanese, Batak and Balinese slave women. Their descendants moved to Penang and Singapore during the period of British rule. Chinese men in colonial southeast Asia also obtained slave wives from Nias. Chinese men in Singapore and Penang were supplied with slave wives of Bugis, Batak, and Balinese origin. The British colonial government tolerated the importation of slave wives since they improved the standard of living for the slaves and provided contentment to the male population. The usage of slave women or house maids as wives by the Chinese was widespread.

It cannot be denied, however, that the existence of slavery in this quarter, in former years, was of immense advantage in procuring a female population for Pinang. From Assaban alone, there used to be sometimes 300 slaves, principally females, exported to Malacca and Pinang in a year. The women get comfortably settled as the wives of opulent Chinese merchants, and live in the greatest comfort. Their families attach these men to the soil; and many never think of returning to their native country. The female population of Pinang is still far from being upon a par with the male; and the abolition therefore of slavery, has been a vast sacrifice to philanthropy and humanity. As the condition of the slaves who were brought to the British settlements, was materially improved, and as they contributed so much to the happiness of the male population, and the general prosperity of the settlement, I am disposed to think (although I detest the principles of slavery as much as any man), that the continuance of the system here could not, under the benevolent regulations which were in force to prevent abuse, have been productive of much evil. The sort of slavery indeed which existed in the British settlements in this quarter, had nothing but the name against it; for the condition of the slaves who were brought from the adjoining countries, was always ameliorated by the change; they were well fed and clothed; the women became wives of respectable Chinese; and the men who were in the least industrious, easily emancipated themselves, and many became wealthy. Severity by masters was punished; and, in short, I do not know any race of people who were, and had every reason to be, so happy and contented as the slaves formerly, and debtors as they are now called, who came from the east coast of Sumatra and other places.Anderson 
John Anderson – Agent to the Government of Prince of Wales Island

Peranakans themselves later on migrated between Malaysia, Indonesia and Singapore, which resulted in a high degree of cultural similarity between Peranakans in those countries. Economic / educational reasons normally propel the migration between of Peranakans between the Nusantara region (Malaysia, Indonesia and Singapore), their creole language is very close to the indigenous languages of those countries, which makes adaptations a lot easier. In Indonesia, a large population of Peranakans can be found in Tangerang, West Java.

People of Chinese ancestry in Phuket, Thailand make up a significant population, many of whom having descended from tin miners who migrated to the island during the 19th century. The Peranakans there are known as "Phuket Babas" in the local tongue, constitute a fair share of members Chinese community, particularly among those who have family ties with the Peranakans of Penang and Malacca.

For political reasons, Peranakans and other Nusantara Chinese are grouped as one racial group, Chinese, with Chinese in Singapore and Malaysia becoming more adoptive of mainland Chinese culture, and Chinese in Indonesia becoming more diluted in their Chinese culture. Such things can be attributed to the policies of Bumiputera and Chinese-National Schools in Malaysia, mother tongue policy in Singapore, and the ban of Chinese culture during the New Order era in Indonesia.

Chinese who married local Javanese women and converted to Islam created a distinct Chinese Muslim Peranakan community in Java. Chinese rarely had to convert to Islam to marry Javanese abangan women but a significant number of their offspring did, and Batavian Muslims absorbed the Chinese Muslim community which was descended from converts. Adoption of Islam back then was a marker of peranakan status which it no longer means. The Semaran Adipati and the Jayaningrat families were of Chinese origin.

Peranakans were held in high regard by Malays. Some Malays in the past may have taken the word "Baba", referring to Chinese males, and put it into their name, when this used to be the case. This is not followed by the younger generation, and the current Chinese Malaysians do not have the same status or respect as Peranakans used to have.

In Penang, Thai women replaced Nias slave women and Batak slave women as wives of Chinese men after the 1830s when slavery was abolished.

Culture

Clothing

The Peranakan retained most of their ethnic and religious origins (such as ancestor worship), but assimilated the language and culture of the Malays.
The Nyonya's clothing, Baju Panjang (Long Dress) was adapted from the native Malay's Baju Kurung. It is worn with a batik sarong (batik wrap-around skirt) and three kerosang (brooches). Peranakan beaded slippers called Kasot Manek were hand-made with much skill and patience: strung, beaded and sewn onto canvas with tiny faceted glass cut beads (known as Manek Potong) from Bohemia (present-day Czech Republic).

Traditional kasot manek design often have European floral subjects, with colours influenced by Peranakan porcelain and batik sarongs. They were made into flats or bedroom slippers. But from the 1930s, modern shapes became popular and heels were gradually added.

In Indonesia, the Peranakans develop their own kebaya, most notably kebaya encim, derived from the name encim or enci to refer to a married Chinese woman. Kebaya encim was commonly worn by Chinese ladies in Javan coastal cities with significant Chinese settlements, such as Semarang, Lasem, Tuban, Surabaya, Pekalongan and Cirebon. It marked differently from Javanese kebaya with its smaller and finer embroidery, lighter fabrics and more vibrant colours. They also developed their own batik patterns, which incorporate symbols from China. The kebaya encim fit well with vibrant-coloured kain batik pesisiran (Javan coastal batik), which incorporated symbols and motives from China; such as dragon, phoenix, peony and lotus. For the Baba they will wear baju lokchuan (which is the Chinese men's full costume) but the younger generation they will wear just the top of it which is the long-sleeved silk jacket with Chinese collar or the batik shirt.

Religion

Most Peranakans generally subscribed to Chinese beliefs systems such as Taoism, Confucianism and Han Buddhism, and even Roman Christianity nowadays. Just like the Chinese, the Peranakans also celebrate Lunar New Year, Lantern Festival and other Chinese festivals, while adopting the customs of the land they settled in, as well as those of their colonial rulers. There are traces of Portuguese, Dutch, British, Malay and Indonesian influences in Peranakan culture.

Just like in any other cultures, the Peranakans still believe in pantang larang (meaning superstition) especially among the older generations. In some cases, quite a number the Peranakan's pantang larang are deemed too strict and complex. But today, most Peranakans no longer practice complex pantang larang to keep up with the modern times.

Christianity

A significant number of the modern Peranakan community have embraced Christianity, most notably in Indonesia.

In 2019, a new branch of Singapore-specific Peranakan intermarriages were found to exist within the early Roman Catholic Church starting from 1834. This early church was set up by French missionaries (Mission Enstrangeres de Paris Order) in 1832 on Bras Basah Road, on the grounds  of the present day Singapore Art Museum. Approximately 26 intermarriages between mainly China-born Teochew men and Melaka Serani, Malay, Peranakan Chinese and Indian women, took place under the auspices of this church, between 1834 and the early 1870s. Most, if not all descendants, identify as Teochew Peranakans today.

In Singapore, the Kampong Kapor Methodist Church, founded in 1894 by an Australian missionary, Sophia Blackmore, is considered one of the first Peranakan churches. During its establishment, Sunday service were conducted in Baba Malay language, and it is still one of the languages being used in their services.

Despite living in Muslim majority countries such as Indonesia and Malaysia, converting to Christianity allows Peranakans to continue eating pork which is a key part of the Peranakan diet. Moreover, Peranakans were traditionally English educated at missionary schools, notably in Penang.

Islam
In Indonesia, Peranakan  referred to all Indonesian Chinese who had converted to Islam up until the 19th century. This indicated the importance of Islamic identity as a "criterion of indigenization." Later, Peranakan referred to all Indonesian Chinese born in the country, including those of descendants of mixed race unions. Large numbers of Peranakans, many from Fujian having prior experience with foreign Muslims who had a dominant position in that provinces most important seaport, adopted Islam in Java, strongly Muslim areas of Indonesia, and Malaysia. As in the case of the Peranakans in Cirebon, this conversion process occurred over several centuries and was even recorded before the Dutch seized Jakarta. Many of these Peranakans in Indonesia who converted to Islam would marry into aristocratic dynasties. One organisation of Indonesian Peranakan Muslims is the Persatuan Islam Tionghoa Indonesia (Association of Indonesian Chinese Muslims), which was formed in 1936 in Medan. Some prominent Peranakan Muslims include the Indonesians Junus Jahja, Abdul Karim Oei Tjeng Hien and Tjio Wie Tay and from Pattani, the Peranakan convert to Islam, Datu Seri Nara, who according to Wybrand of Warwijck was the most important commercial and military figure in Pattani in 1602.

Food

Due to the culture of Nyonya and Babas is merged between Malay and Chinese and influence by Indonesia. Malacca was once the world's merchant gathering point enabling the birth of Baba and Nyonya ethnic group. Therefore, the Nyonya food can be summarized as "Malay Archipelago Delicacies of Nanyang Cuisine".

From the Malay influence, a unique "Nyonya" cuisine has developed using typical Malay spices. Examples are chicken kapitan, a dry chicken curry and inchi kabin, a Nyonya version of fried chicken. Pindang bandeng is a common fish soup served in Indonesia during the Chinese New Year and so is a white round mooncake from Tangerang which is normally used during the Autumn Festival. Swikee purwodadi is a Peranakan dish from Purwodadi, a frog soup dish.

Nyonya laksa is a very popular dish in Malacca, Malaysia while another variant called asam laksa is famous in Penang, Malaysia. Pongteh is also another popular and savoury dish of the Malaccan Peranakan community. The main ingredient is onion, black mushroom (optional), chicken (at times pork is used instead of chicken, hence it's called babi pongteh) and fermented bean sauce. The Malaccan Nyonyas are well known for this dish.

Other dishes from the east coast of Peninsular Malaysia Peranakans in Kelantan include telur kesum, ayam kerabu and khau jam are influenced by Chinese, Malay and Thai cuisine. While in Terengganu, popular Peranakan foods are such as the local version of crab cake, ayam pachok which resembles satay with a stronger flavour, fish in spicy tamarind sauce and slow-cooked chicken with palm sugar.

Besides that, Peranakans of Malacca are also well known for a wide variety of traditional cakes (kueh or kue) such as lepak kacang, ang ku kue (a black variant is called kueh ku hitam), kueh tae or nastar, Nyonya bak chang, apom balik (Peranakan's version closely resembles Indonesian's serabi), kueh bakol, tapae, kueh kochi, kueh bongkong, rempah udang, pulot enti, kueh gulong (another variant is kueh kapit), kueh bolu, galeng galoh (also known as seri muka), kueh bangket and many more. Traditional kueh (or kue) are sometimes made in conjunction with festivals that the Peranakans celebrate. For example, kueh genggang (also commonly known as kueh lapis), is a type of multi layered cake, most often eaten during Chinese New Year to symbolise a ladder of continued prosperity.

A small number of restaurants serving Nyonya food can be found in Penang and Malacca in Malaysia; and Jakarta, Semarang and Surabaya in Indonesia.

Marriage

It was not uncommon for early Chinese traders to take Malay women from Peninsular Malaya or Sumatra as wives or concubines. Consequently, the Baba Nyonya display a mix of Sino-Malay cultural traits.

Written records from the 19th and early 20th centuries show that Peranakan men usually took brides from within the local Peranakan community. Peranakan families occasionally imported brides from China and sent their daughters to China to find husbands.

Marriages within the community and of similar stature were the norm during that time. Wealthy men prefigured to marry a chin choay: or matrilocal marriage where husband moved in with the wife's family.

Proposals of marriage were made by a gift of a pinangan, in a 2-tiered lacquered basket known as Bakul Siah in Malaysia or Tenong Keranjang in Indonesia, to the intended bride's parents brought by a go-between who speaks on behalf of the suitor. There are rare cases where wealthy Peranakans in the past used highly decorative glided pagoda trays (Botekan Candi in Indonesian) instead of the Bakul Siah or Tenong Keranjang. Most Peranakans have retained the traditions of ancestor worship of the Chinese, though some have converted to Christianity and Islam.

The wedding ceremony of the Peranakan is largely based on Chinese tradition, and is one of the most colourful wedding ceremonies in Malaysia. At Malacca weddings, the Dondang Sayang, a form of extempore rhyming song in Malay sung and danced by guests at the wedding party, was a highlight. Someone would begin a romantic theme which was carried on by others, each taking the floor in turn, dancing in slow gyrations as they sang. It required quick wit and repartee and often gave rise to laughter and applause when a particularly clever phrase was sung. The melodic accents of the Baba-Nonya and their particular turns of phrase lead to the charm of this performance.

The important wedding rites had to be commenced on auspicious days at specific times, according to the pek ji, the eight Chinese characters annotating one's birth date and time. At these rites, pantangs (taboos) were carefully observed – the wedding rituals had to be legitimised and witnessed by elders, deities and ancestors. Marriages were typically match-made. Parents and elders made the final decision, but the potential bride and bridegroom were also consulted in the process. Wedding items commonly utilised the prosperous colours of red, pink, orange, yellow and gold and were embellished with special motifs to ensure a good marriage. Similar to the Chinese, Peranakans believed that good things always come in pairs, therefore many wedding items came in pairs.

Museums

Historical and cultural items from the Peranakan culture are displayed in Baba Nyonya Heritage Museum, Straits Chinese Jewellery Museum and other cultural establishments on Heeren Street, Jonker Street and other streets in the same neighbourhood in Malacca; the Pinang Peranakan Mansion in Penang, Malaysia; and at the Peranakan Museum, Baba House and the Intan Museum in Singapore. Furniture, food, and even traditional clothes of the Baba and Nyonya are exhibited. Free weekly street shows featuring Baba performances, and traditional and pop Chinese cultural performances are found in Jonker Street in Malacca. The shows are part of the night market scene, and are usually crowded with shoppers, both local and foreign.

On 11 November 2011, Benteng Heritage Museum in Tangerang, near Jakarta is opened to display mainly about Benteng Chinese uses an old genuine traditional Chinese Peranakan house. And in August 2013, the Museum Peranakan Indonesia was officially opened by the Yayasan Budaya Tionghoa Indonesia. The museum is located at the Cheng Ho Museum, next to the Hakka Museum, at the pavilion of Taman Budaya Tionghoa Indonesia, Taman Mini Indonesia Indah in Jakarta.

Other Peranakan cultural collections such as batik and bead works can also be found in museums outside of South East Asia. Honolulu Museum of Art and Australian Museum are known to exhibit such collections. 

Apart from that, exhibition of Peranakan Chitty history, antiques and culture can be seen at the Chitty Museum in Kampung Chitty, Malacca, Malaysia. In 2013, there were controversies of development at the expense of demolishing part of Kampung Chitty, a historical and cultural village. A proposal to construct a condominium, a hotel and a road cutting through the village are seen as a threat affecting the residents and a temple built in 1827.

Political affinity

Many Peranakan were active in trade and considered supportive of continued European rule in Malaysia and Indonesia. Peranakans often played the role of middleman of the British and the Chinese, or the Chinese and Malays, because they were mostly English educated and spoke Malay more fluently than newer Chinese immigrants. 

By the middle of the twentieth century, most Peranakan were English or Dutch-educated at Western-style institutions. Peranakans readily embraced Western culture and education as a means to advance economically thus administrative and civil service posts were often filled by prominent Straits Chinese. Many in the community chose to convert to Christianity due to its perceived prestige and proximity to the preferred company of British and Dutch officials.

The Peranakan community thereby became very influential in Malacca and Singapore and were known also as the King's Chinese due to their loyalty to the British Crown. Because of their interaction with different cultures and languages, most Peranakans were (and still are) trilingual, being able to converse in Chinese, Malay, and English.  Common vocations were as merchants, traders, and general intermediaries between China, Malaya and the West; the latter were especially valued by the British and Dutch. 

Things started to change in the first half of the 20th century, with some Peranakans starting to support Malaysian and Indonesian independence.
In Indonesia three Chinese communities started to merge and become active in the political scene. 

They were also among the pioneers of Indonesian newspapers. In their fledgling publishing companies, they published their own political ideas along with contributions from other Indonesian writers. In November 1928, the Chinese weekly Sin Po was the first paper to openly publish the text of the national anthem Indonesia Raya. On occasion, those involved in such activities ran a concrete risk of imprisonment or even of their lives, as the Dutch colonial authorities banned nationalistic publications and activities. 

Chinese were active in supporting the independence movement during the 1940s Japanese occupation, when the all but the so-called "Overseas Chinese Association", or residents of Chinese ancestry were banned by the Japanese military authorities. Some notable pro-independence activists were Siauw Giok Tjhan, Liem Koen Hian, and Yap Tjwan Bing, a member of Panitia Persiapan Kemerdekaan Indonesia, who in the 1960s became a citizen of the United States.

Current status

Peranakan culture has started to disappear in Malaysia and Singapore. Without support from the colonial government for their perceived ethnic independence, government policies in both countries following independence from colonial rule have resulted in the assimilation of Peranakans back into mainstream Chinese culture. Singapore classifies the Peranakans as ethnically Chinese, so they receive formal instruction in Mandarin Chinese as a second language (in accordance with the "Mother Tongue Policy") instead of Malay. In Malaysia, the standardisation of Malay as Bahasa Melayu—required for all ethnic groups—has led to a disappearance of the unique characteristics of Baba Malay.

In Indonesia, the Peranakan culture appears to be losing popularity to modern Western culture, but to some degree the Peranakans are still trying to retain their language, cuisines and customs. Young Peranakans still speak their creole language, although many young women do not wear the kebaya. Marriages normally follow the western culture because the traditional Peranakan customs are losing popularity. Only three communities of Peranakan still uphold the traditional Peranakan wedding customs, Tangerang (by the Cina Benteng people), Makassar and Padang. Of the three communities the Cina Benteng people are the most adherent to the Peranakan culture, but their numbers are dwindling.

Cina Benteng people are normally poor people and many seek, or have sought, opportunities in other areas. Some organisations do try to ease their burden of living. As of May 2012, 108 Cina Benteng families are facing eviction from their traditional homes, the reason given by the Tangerang government being that the area they occupy is actually meant as a green space for the city. Most of these families are low income and have nowhere to move to, as the government is not providing enough money for them to relocate. Several traumatic eviction attempts at 2010 and 2011 ended in violence.

The migration of some Peranakan families, particularly the well-to-do, has led to a small Peranakan diaspora to neighbouring countries, mainly from Vietnam to Australia. The 1998 anti-Chinese riots in Indonesia during the fall of Suharto terrorised many Chinese Indonesians and Peranakans alike, causing Chinese Indonesian communities affected by the riots to leave the country. However, these communities are very small, and with the increasing use of the various languages in their respective countries, the use of Peranakan Malay or Baba Malay has been diluted, especially among the younger generation.

Current associations

Associations of Chinese Peranakans include The Peranakan Association Singapore (TPAS), Aspertina (Asosiasi Peranakan Tionghoa Indonesia) and the Gunong Sayang Association (GSA), a performing arts group in Singapore. The Peranakan Association Singapore has over 2,000 members, and the Gunong Sayang Association has about 200 members. The Peranakan Association Singapore consists of a mix of young and old members, while the Gunung Sayang Association has primarily elderly or retired members. In Malacca, there is an Indian Peranakan Association known as the Chitty Melaka. This is a tightly knit community of Saivite Hindus. Chitty Peranakans display considerable similarity to Chinese Peranakans in terms of dressing, songs, folk dances and pantun.

In Malaysia, there are Peranakan associations in Malacca, KL and Penang.

The Thai Peranakans live largely in Phuket and have an Association as well.

There are also Peranakan associations in Australia: Melbourne, Perth and New South Wales.

In popular culture

Interest in the Peranakan culture had begun as early as the 1950s with films from Hong Kong such as the Niangre / Nyonyah (Yue Feng, 1952), Fengyu Niuche Shui / Rainstorm in Chinatown (Yan Jun 1956), Niangre Yu Baba / Nonya And Baba (Yan Jun 1956), and Niangre Zhi Lian / Love With A Malaysian Girl (Lui Kei, 1969).

In Malaysia, a comedy drama series, Baba Nyonya was popular in the 1990s. The series is recognised by the Malaysian Book Of Records as the longest-running TV series in the country ever, lasting from the late 1980s until 2000, with 509 episodes in total.

Along the passing of the Reform Era in Indonesia and the removal of the ban on Chinese culture, in 1999, Indonesian writer Remy Sylado released a novel called Ca-Bau-Kan: Hanya Sebuah Dosa raised the Peranakan culture and history in Indonesia. The novel was adapted into a film called Ca-Bau-Kan by Nia Dinata in 2002. Riri Riza directed a biographical film on an Indonesian student activist named Soe Hok Gie (played by Nicholas Saputra), entitled Gie in 2005. The film is based on a diary Catatan Seorang Demonstran written by Soe Hok Gie, features a glimpse into the everyday life of an Indonesian Peranakan family in the 1960s. A novel that elevates the history and culture of the Benteng Chinese (Cina Benteng is another term in Indonesian referring to Peranakan) titled Bonsai: Hikayat Satu Keluarga Cina Benteng written by Pralampita Lembahmata and published by Gramedia in 2011.

In 2008, a Singaporean drama series The Little Nyonya was aired in Singapore, and later gained popularity in Asia especially within South East Asia region. The filming of the drama took place in Malacca, Penang and Ipoh, Malaysia.

In Yasmin Ahmad films Sepet and Gubra has featured Peranakan character as the lead actor's mother played by Peranakan actress Tan Mei Ling. Lead actors from the 1990s Baba Nyonya series were also featured in Namewee's multi-language and multi-cultural film, Nasi Lemak 2.0 in 2011, showcasing Peranakan culture.

Notable Peranakans

Indonesia

 Agnes Monica: Artist, Singer
 Arief Budiman: Also known as Soe Hok Djin, the older brother of Soe Hok Gie
 Auwjong Peng koen: Indonesian Journalist, Founder of Kompas a national newspaper
 Basuki Tjahaja Purnama: Politician
 Chris John: Professional boxer
 Christian Hadinata: Badminton player
 Christianto Wibisono: Business analyst
 Chrisye: Singer
 Erick Thohir: Businessman and Minister of State Owned Enterprises
 Fifi Young: Actress
 Han Bwee Kong, Kapitein der Chinezen: magnate, government official and landlord in East Java
 Hok Hoei Kan: colonial politician, landlord, patrician and a member of the Han family of Lasem
 Kho Sin-Kie: Professional tennis player
 Khouw Kim An, 5th Majoor der Chinezen of Batavia: bureaucrat, last Chinese head of colonial Jakarta, member of the Khouw family of Tamboen
 O. G. Khouw: philanthropist, landlord and member of the Khouw family of Tamboen
 Khouw Tian Sek, Luitenant-titulair der Chinezen: landlord, magnate and patriarch of the Khouw family of Tamboen
 Kwee Tek Hoay: Journalist, novelist
 Kwik Kian Gie: Economist, Coordinating Minister of Economics and Finance (1999–2000), and National Development Planning Minister (2001–2004) of Indonesia
 Lie Kim Hok: Teacher, writer and a social worker of the Dutch East Indies
 Liem Swie King: National shuttler
 Loa Sek Hie: colonial politician, community leader, landlord and founder of Pao An Tui
 Margaretha Tjoa Liang Tjoe: Novelist
 Mari Pangestu: Economist, Trade Minister (2004–2011), and Tourism and Creative Economy Minister (2011) of Indonesia
 Mira Widjaja (Wong): Author, daughter of Othniel
 Oei Tiong Ham, Majoor-titulair der Chinezen: Businessman and founder of the largest conglomerate in the Dutch East Indies, Oei Tiong Ham Concern
 Oey Tamba Sia: playboy, tycoon's heir and criminal
 Phoa Keng Hek: Social worker and entrepreneur
 Phoa Liong Gie: colonial politician, jurist and newspaper owner, great-nephew of Phoa Keng Hek
 Rudy Hartono: National shuttler
 Soe Hok Gie: Student activist
 Kyai Ronggo Ngabehi Soero Pernollo: Chinese-Javanese nobleman, bureaucrat and police chief
 Susi Susanti: National shuttler
 Tan Joe Hok: National shuttler
 Tan Liok Tiauw: Colonial landlord, plantation owner, industrialist
 Tio Ie Soei: Writer and journalist of the Dutch East Indies
 Titi DJ: Artist, Singer
 Thung Sin Nio (1902–1996): physician, politician, suffragist

Malaysia

 Azizan Baba: former professional footballer
 Chuah Guat Eng: Novelist
 Chung Thye Phin: Last Kapitan China of the state of Perak and British Malaya
Desmond Ho: Landscape designer
 Emily Lim: Actress, model, host and nutritionist
 Gan Eng Seng: Malaccan born businessman and philanthropist in Singapore and Malaya
 Janet Khoo: Actress
 Khoo Kay Kim: Historian
 Mavin Khoo: Dancer, son of Khoo Kay Kim
 Nathaniel Tan: Politician and writer
 Tan Chay Yan: Rubber plantation merchant and philanthropist, grandson of Tan Tock Seng
 Tan Cheng Lock: Founder and first President of Malaysian Chinese Association (MCA)
 Tan Siew Sin: Third President of Malaysian Chinese Association (MCA) and first Finance Minister of Malaysia (1959–1974), son of Tan Cheng Lock
 Tan Tock Seng: Malaccan born merchant and philanthropist in Singapore
 Tan Twan Eng: Penang-born novelist known for being the first Malaysian recipient of the Man Asian Literary Prize.

Singapore
 David Lim Kim San: Head of Music Department in the Ministry of Education (1969)
 Dick Lee: Celebrity pop singer, composer and playwright
 Gan Eng Seng: Malaccan born businessman and philanthropist in Straits Settlement of Singapore and Malaya
 Goh Keng Swee: Deputy Prime Minister of Singapore
 Ivan Heng: Actor
 Lee Hsien Loong: Third Prime Minister of Singapore
 Lee Kuan Yew: First Prime Minister of modern Singapore
 Lim Boon Keng: Penang born physician and social activist in Singapore
 Violet Oon: Chef, restaurateur, and food writer specializing in Peranakan cuisine
 Lim Kim San: Former Cabinet Minister
 Lim Nee Soon: Merchant and entrepreneur of the Straits Settlement of Singapore
 Pierre Png: Mediacorp artiste
 Piya Tan: Buddhist writer and teacher
 Seow Poh Leng: Banker, philanthropist and a committee member of the Straits Settlement (Settlement of Singapore)
 Song Hoot Kiam: Teacher, cashier and a community leader
 Sir Song Ong Siang: Lawyer and active citizen of the Straits Settlement of Singapore, son of Song Hoot Kiam
 Tan Chin Tuan: Chairman of OCBC
 Tan Kim Ching: Politician and businessman, the eldest son of Tan Tock Seng, major donor of Tan Si Chong Su
 Tan Kim Seng: Malaccan born philanthropist and merchant
 Tan Tock Seng: Malaccan born merchant and philanthropist of the Straits Settlement of Singapore, leader of Hokkien clan and major donor of Thian Hock Keng
 Toh Chin Chye: Deputy Prime Minister of Singapore
 Tony Tan: Seventh President of Singapore
 Walter Woon: Lawyer, academic, diplomat, politician and 7th Attorney-General of Singapore
 Wee Kim Wee: Fourth President of Singapore

See also
 Cabang Atas
 Minh Hương
 Overseas Chinese
 Sangley

References

Further reading

External links

 "Benteng Chinese: Barely Indonesian" in "Invisible People: Poverty and Empowerment in Indonesia
 Forbes, Andrew, and Henley, David, Phuket's Historic Peranakan Community
 Interactive 360 X 360 degree VR preview of The Peranakan Museum
Gunong Sayang Association
The Peranakan Association of Singapore
NUS Baba House
 Asosiasi Peranakan Tionghoa Indonesia
 Peranakan Association Australia Incorporated
 Singapore's Mother Tongue Policy
 Petition for a Peranakan Town in Singapore
 Pinang Peranakan Mansion
 Baba & Nyonya House Museum, Melaka
 The Intan Museum, Singapore
 Review over one of the peranakan in Penang from photo-outing.com
 Some Articles On Peranakan Communities in Java
 Peranakan collections from the Peranakan Museum, Singapore
 The Peranakan Story
 Islands And Peoples Of The Indies

Chinese diaspora in Malaysia
Chinese diaspora in Singapore
Chinese diaspora
Ethnic groups in Malaysia
Chinese diaspora in Indonesia

Chinese Indonesian culture
Ethnic groups in Indonesia
Immigration to Malaysia
Subgroups of the Han Chinese